Sienna or Siena is a feminine given name of Italian origin and unclear meaning.  The original usage of the name is derived from the Italian city and may also refer to the burnt orange color of its clay rooftops. Roman Catholics have sometimes used the name in honor of Saint Catherine of Siena.

Popularity
The name is currently well-used in English-speaking countries such as Great Britain, New Zealand, Australia, Canada and the United States. It is also well-used in France and the Netherlands

Notable people
 Sienna Guillory, a British actress
 Sienna Miller, a British and American actress
 Sienna Rodgers, LabourList editor
 Sienna (wrestler)
Sienna Elizabeth Mapelli Mozzi, daughter of Princess Beatrice of York

Characters
 Sienna Blake, a fictional character in UK soap opera Hollyoaks

References

English feminine given names
Feminine given names